The 2000 Liga Indonesia Premier Division Final was a football match which was played on 23 July 2000 at Gelora Senayan Main Stadium in Jakarta. It was contested by PSM Makassar and Pupuk Kaltim to determine the winner of the 1999–2000 Liga Indonesia Premier Division. PSM Makassar won the match 3–2 to claim their first-ever professional title.

Road to the final

Match details

References

External links
Liga Indonesia Premier Division standings

2000